The 2013–14 Utah Valley Wolverines women's basketball team represented Utah Valley University in the 2013–14 college basketball season. Cathy Nixon entered the season as head coach for the 18th consecutive season. The Wolverines played their home games at the UCCU Center and the PE Building as new members of the WAC.

Roster

Schedule and results
Source

|-
!colspan=8 style="background:#CFB53B; color:#006633;"| Exhibition

|-
!colspan=8 style="background:#006633; color:#CFB53B;"| Regular Season

|-
!colspan=8 style="background:#CFB53B; color:#006633;"| 2014 WAC women's basketball tournament

See also
2013–14 Utah Valley Wolverines men's basketball team

References

Utah Valley Wolverines women's basketball seasons
Utah Valley